Becoming Colette is a 1992 German-British-French biographical drama film written by Ruth Graham, directed by Danny Huston and starring Klaus Maria Brandauer and Mathilda May as Henry Gauthier-Villars and Colette respectively.

Cast
Klaus Maria Brandauer as Henry Gauthier-Villars
Mathilda May as Colette
Virginia Madsen as Polaire
Paul Rhys as Chapo
John van Dreelen as Albert
Jean-Pierre Aumont as Captain
Lucienne Hamon as Sido
Georg Tryphon as Creditor

Release
The film was released in New York City on November 6, 1992.

Reception
Joe Leydon of Variety gave the film a negative review and wrote, "Not even a twinkly eyed, scene-stealing turn by Klaus Maria Brandauer is enough to enliven Danny Huston's Becoming Colette ..."

Peter Rainer of the Los Angeles Times also gave the film a negative review and wrote, "The film, which was directed by Danny Huston and scripted by Ruth Graham, has an airless, disembodied quality—not exactly what one wants from a movie about a sensualist of genius."

Rita Kempley of The Washington Post also gave the film a negative review, describing it as "negligible".

References

External links